Kemp-Welch is a double-barrelled surname of British origin. People with that surname include:

 Edith Kemp-Welch (18701941), English artist
 George Kemp-Welch (19071944), English cricketer
 Joan Kemp-Welch (19061999), British stage and film actress
 John Kemp-Welch (born 1936), British businessman
 Lucy Kemp-Welch (18691958), British painter and teacher
 Margaret Kemp-Welch (18741968), British painter and teacher

See also
Kemp (surname)
Welch (surname)

Compound surnames
English-language surnames
Surnames of English origin